Lyle Chester Neat (September 29, 1916 – December 5, 1996) was an American professional basketball guard who played in one game in the National Basketball League (NBL) as a member of the Fort Wayne Zollner Pistons during the 1946–47 season. He was born in Indiana to William and Blanch Neat, who had eight other children. He died on December 5, 1996 in Marion, Indiana.

References

External links
Career statistics and player information from Basketball-Reference.com

1916 births
1996 deaths
American men's basketball players
United States Army personnel of World War II
Basketball players from Indiana
Butler Bulldogs men's basketball players
Fort Wayne Zollner Pistons players
Guards (basketball)